Ali Rıza Alan (born 3 February 1947 Batman, Turkey) is a Turkish and former wrestler who competed in the 1972 Summer Olympics.

References

External links
 

1947 births
Living people
Olympic wrestlers of Turkey
Wrestlers at the 1972 Summer Olympics
Turkish male sport wrestlers
World Wrestling Championships medalists